Delta Lupi (δ Lupi, δ Lup) is a star in the southern circumpolar constellation of Lupus. In traditional Chinese astronomy, it is "the 2nd (star) of the Cavalry Officer" (騎官二). With an apparent visual magnitude of 3.2, it is the fourth-brightest star in the constellation. The distance to this star has been measured using the parallax technique, yielding an estimate of roughly 900 light-years with a 15% margin of error.

The spectrum of this star matches a stellar classification of B1.5 IV, which indicates this star has entered the subgiant stage and is in the process of evolving into a giant star. It is radiating around 10,000 times the luminosity of the Sun from its outer atmosphere at an effective temperature of 23,000 K, giving it a blue-white hue. This star has nearly 12 times the mass of the Sun and is roughly 15 million years old.

Delta Lupi is a Beta Cephei variable star that undergoes periodic pulsations. It has a single period of variability lasting 0.1655 days, or six cycles per day. This is a proper motion member of the Upper Centaurus–Lupus sub-group in the Scorpius–Centaurus OB association, the nearest such co-moving association of massive stars to the Sun.

See also 
 Traditional Chinese star names#Lupus

References 

Lupi, Delta
Lupus (constellation)
Beta Cephei variables
B-type subgiants
Upper Centaurus Lupus
5695
075141
136298
CD-40 09538